Law Week Colorado is Colorado's weekly online news source for lawyers and an information source on legal issues in the state and around the nation. It is available to the public and circulates widely to lawyers in private practice and public service, judges, and corporate counsel from offices in Denver. It also is an official Colorado legal publication, as defined by state statute.

The publication, launched in 2002, is owned by privately held Circuit Media LLC, which also owns State Bill Colorado.

Features

Law Week covers items of interest to lawyers, including lawsuits, practice management, firm news, notable verdicts, and industry gossip. The publication has had sponsor relationships with organizations including Best Lawyers  and the Colorado chapter of the Legal Marketing Association. 

Among the signature features that regularly appear in Law Week are Barrister's Best, an annual presentation of peer-recommended lawyers in the state; Big Deals, a quarterly summary of significant merger and acquisition transactions executed by Colorado lawyers; Legal Lasso, a daily summary of the publication's stories; Managing Partner Roundtable, a four-times-per-year group interview with leaders of Front Range law firms; Outstanding Legal Professionals, a periodic celebration of acclaimed paralegals and legal assistants in the state's legal sector; Top Women, which provides a spotlight on outstanding female attorneys in Colorado; Up-and-Coming Lawyers, a glimpse at early-career attorneys in the state; and 5Q, a twice-weekly opportunity for lawyers, judges, and other professionals in the state's legal community to provide brief insights into their views on issues facing the profession and their personality.

Law Week also regularly publishes a look at Colorado legal history and a summary of Colorado Supreme Court and Colorado Court of Appeals opinions. Guest contributors supply occasional commentary.

Publisher and Editorial Staff

The publisher is Rebecca Askew. As of September 2021 the managing editor is Jess Brovsky-Eaker. Law Week reporters include Jessica Folker, Clara Geoghegan and Avery Martinez.

Awards and recognition

Law Week has been recognized for its journalism with a Top of the Rockies award.

References

External links

Newspapers published in Colorado
Weekly newspapers published in the United States
Legal newspapers
Mass media in Denver